The Starwind 22 is an American trailerable sailboat that was designed by Halsey Herreshoff as a cruiser and first built in 1982.

Production
The design was built by Starwind, from 1982 to 1984 and also by Chrysler Marine in the United States, but it is now out of production. It was replaced in production by the Starwind 223.

Design
The Starwind 22 is a recreational sailboat, built predominantly of fiberglass, with wood trim. It has a fractional sloop or optional masthead sloop rig, a raked stem, a reverse transom, a transom-hung rudder controlled by a tiller and a retractable centerboard. It displaces  and carries  of ballast.  of flooding water ballast. The ballast is drained for road transport.

The boat is normally fitted with a small  outboard motor for docking and maneuvering.

The design has sleeping accommodation for five people, with a double "V"-berth in the bow cabin, a straight settee and a drop-down dinette table that forms a double berth in the main cabin. The galley is located on the starboard side just aft of the bow cabin. The galley is equipped with a two-burner stove and a sink. The head is located in the bow cabin on the starboard side.

See also
List of sailing boat types

References

    

1980s sailboat type designs
Sailing yachts 
Trailer sailers
Sailboat type designs by Halsey Herreshoff
Sailboat types built by Chrysler Marine
Sailboat types built by Starwind